Hospitalbank is a townland in County Westmeath, Ireland.

Hospitalbank is one of 35 townlands of the civil parish of Street in the barony of Moygoish in the Province of Leinster. The southeastern boundary of the townland is formed by the River Inny.

The neighbouring townlands are: Derradd to the north, Lackanwood to the east, Ballyharney to the south and Monagead to the west.

In the 1911 census of Ireland there were 3 houses and 14 inhabitants in the townland.

References

External links
Map of Hospitalbank at openstreetmap.org
Hospitalbank at the IreAtlas Townland Data Base
Hospitalbank at Townlands.ie
Hospitalbank at The Placenames Database of Ireland, Department of Arts, Heritage and the Gaeltacht

Townlands of County Westmeath